The RioGaleão Light Rail is a future light rail line serving the Brazilian city of Rio de Janeiro.

It will be a light rail, with trains with more cars than the current Rio light rail system, but less than the Rio metro system. Estácio station is expected to receive self check-in machines and passengers would be able to dispatch their luggage.

References

See also
 Rio de Janeiro/Galeão International Airport
 Rio de Janeiro Metro
 Rio de Janeiro Light Rail

Proposed railway lines in Brazil